Karl-Åke Hultberg (17 September 1915 – 28 April 1997) was a Swedish equestrian. He competed in two events at the 1948 Summer Olympics.

References

External links
 

1915 births
1997 deaths
Swedish male equestrians
Olympic equestrians of Sweden
Equestrians at the 1948 Summer Olympics
People from Åtvidaberg Municipality
Sportspeople from Östergötland County